Reginald Richard Bradley (November 27, 1873 – July 27, 1922) was a Canadian ice hockey and football player. Bradley played for the Ontario champion Ottawa Hockey Club from 1890 to 1894. During the 1892–93 Ottawa Hockey Club season, he led the club with 11 goals in 8 games.

Personal information
Bradley attended Ottawa Collegiate Institute in Ottawa, captaining the football team. He attended law school at Toronto University and Osgoode Hall Law School and worked for a well-known law firm in Ottawa. He died of a short illness in July 1922.

References

 

Ice hockey people from Ottawa
Ottawa Senators (original) players
1873 births
1922 deaths
Lisgar Collegiate Institute alumni
Canadian ice hockey forwards